Sarpanch Bhagirath is an Indian Marathi language film directed by Ramdas Phutaneand produced by Shivkumar Lad. The film stars Upendra Limaye, Veena Jamkar , Mohan Agashe and Kishor Kadam. Music by Sambhaji Bhagat. The film was released on 4 March 2016.

Synopsis 
The story of how caste politics is played in rural areas is presented. As the sarpanch post of the village is reserved, Bhagirath becomes an OBC youth sarpanch with the help of a leader. The story is about how he has to face the situation, political pressure, caste politics and how he finds a way out of it.

Cast 
 Upendra Limaye As Sarpanch Bhagirath Girme
 Veena Jamkar As Bhagirath Wife Rahi
 Mohan Agashe As Sada Kaka
 Kishor Kadam As Bhagirath Friend Shridhar
 Swarangi Marathe As Salma
 Savita Malpekar As Yamuna Tai

Production 
Principal photography began on 7 December 2012.

Soundtrack

Critical response 
Sarpanch Bhagirath received mixed reviews from critics. Ganesh Matkari of Pune Mirror wrote"The film ends rather abruptly at a point more suitable as an intermission rather than climax, and much remains unsaid and unresolved". Jayanti Waghdhare of Zee News wrote "Ramdas Futane has tried to give proper treatment to the movie. There are many things in the movie which have been seen in many movies before. So there is not much innovation in the cinema". Soumitra Pote  of Maharashtra Times gave the film 3 stars out of 5 and wrote "Though the chosen subject matter is important, the directorial grip seems to be loosened at many places. That's probably why even after the end of the movie, something remains".

References

External links
 

2016 films
2010s Marathi-language films
Indian drama films